Daniele Pietropolli (born 11 July 1980, in Bussolengo, Veneto) is an Italian professional road bicycle racer, who last rode for .

Palmarès

2008
1st Overall Giro della Provincia di Reggio Calabria
1st Stage 3
2009
1st Overall Giro della Provincia di Grosseto
1st Stage 3
1st Overall Settimana Ciclista Lombarda
1st Stage 1 (TTT)
2011
1st Overall Giro della Provincia di Reggio Calabria
1st Stage 1
1st Trofeo Laigueglia
2013
8th Overall Tour Down Under

Grand Tour general classification results timeline

References

External links

1980 births
Living people
Cyclists from the Province of Verona
Italian male cyclists